The Good, The Bad, and the Funky is the fifth studio album of the Tom Tom Club. A remix of the album's second track, "Who Feelin' It?", was featured in the 2000 dark comedy American Psycho as the "Philip's Psycho Mix".

Track listing
All tracks composed by Chris Frantz and Tina Weymouth; except where indicated
  "Time to Bounce"
  "Who Feelin' It?"
  "Happiness Can't Buy Money"
  "Holy Water" (Frantz, Weymouth, Charles Pettigrew)
  "Soulfire" (Lee Perry)
  "She's Dangerous"
  "She's A Freak"
  "(C'Mon) Surrender" (Frantz, Weymouth, Charles Pettigrew)
  "Love to Love You Baby" (Donna Summer, Giorgio Moroder, Pete Bellotte)
 "Superdreaming"
 "Lesbians by the Lake" (Frantz, Weymouth, Abdou M'Boup)
 "Let There Be Love" (Frantz, Weymouth, Charles Pettigrew)
 "Time to Bounce" (Dubbed version)
 "Dangerous Dub"

Personnel
Bernie Worrell – organ, clavinet
Chris Frantz – drums, percussion, keyboards, loops, vocals
Toots Hibbert – vocals
Abdou M'Boup – percussion, kora
Doug McKean – mixing, sample arrangements
James Rizzi – artwork
Steve Scales – mixing, conga
Tina Weymouth – organ, synthesizer, synthesizer bass, piano, acoustic guitar, bass, vocals
Bruce Martin – keyboards
Charles Pettigrew – vocals
Robby Aceto – electric guitar, guitar effects
Sergio Rotman – electric guitar, saxophone
Mystic Bowie – toasting

References

External links
Amazon.com link, including reviews
Album cover

2000 albums
Tom Tom Club albums
Rykodisc albums
Albums produced by Chris Frantz
Albums produced by Tina Weymouth